The Sacred Depths of Nature is a 1998 book by biologist Ursula W. Goodenough on the history of life on earth within the context of religious naturalism. It has recently been translated into Persian as  Minoo-ye Tabi'at (Persian: مینوی طبیعت).

1998 books
1998 in religion